Speccapollia is a genus of sea snails, marine gastropod mollusks in the family Prodotiidae.

Species
 Speccapollia africana Fraussen & Stahlschmidt, 2016
 Speccapollia recurva (Reeve, 1846)
 Speccapollia tokiae (Chino & Fraussen, 2015)

References

 Fraussen K. & Stahlschmidt P. (2016). Revision of the Clivipollia group (Gastropoda: Buccinidae: Pisaniinae) with description of two new genera and three new species. Novapex. 17(2-3): 29-46.

Prodotiidae